The 2012–13 Scottish Junior Cup was the 127th season of the Scottish Junior Cup, the national knockout tournament for member clubs of the Scottish Junior Football Association. The competition was sponsored by Emirates and is known as The Emirates Junior Cup for sponsorship purposes. The winner of this competition was eligible to enter the following season's Scottish Cup at the first round stage.

A total of 163 clubs entered, one fewer than the previous season. Dropping out were Stonehouse Violet, who had folded and Dufftown, who are in abeyance. Scone Thistle returned to the tournament after taking one season out of the game.

The five Junior clubs qualified for this season's Scottish Cup, were not included in the draw for the first round. These were the three Superleague champions: Bonnyrigg Rose Athletic (East), Hermes (North) and Irvine Meadow (West); the Scottish Junior Cup winners Shotts Bon Accord, and Girvan who qualify automatically as a full member of the Scottish Football Association.

Calendar
The scheduled dates for each round of the 2012–13 tournament were as follows:

Drawn matches are replayed the following weekend. Replays ending in a draw proceed direct to penalty shootout. Semifinals are played home and away over two legs, subject to decision by the SJFA management committee.

First round
The first round draw took place at the Scottish Football Museum, Hampden Park, Glasgow on 22 August 2012.

1 Tie played at New Elgin F.C.2 Tie played at Ravenscraig Regional Sports Facility

Replays

Second round
The second round draw took place at the Shotts Bon Accord Social Club, Shotts on 30 September 2012.

3 Tie played at Nairn St. Ninian F.C.

Replays

Third round
The third round draw took place at the offices of the Sun newspaper, Glasgow, on 6 November 2012.

4 Tie played at Oakley United F.C.5 Tie played at Arthurlie F.C.6 Tie played at Kinnoull F.C.

Replays

7 Tie played at Ravenscraig Regional Sports Facility8 Tie played at Forfar Athletic F.C.

Fourth round
The fourth round draw took place at the offices of the Evening Times newspaper, Glasgow, on 27 November 2012.

Replays

Fifth round
The fifth round draw took place on the Clyde 1 football phone-in show, on 7 February 2013.

Quarter-finals
The draw for the quarter finals took place on the Central 103.1 FM football phone-in show, on 26 February 2013.

9 Tie played at Ballingry Rovers F.C.

Semifinals
The draw for the semifinals took place at Mar Hall, Erskine on 24 March 2013, at a training base of the Scotland national football team.

First leg

Second leg

Final

References

4
Scottish Junior Cup seasons